Ōgimachi Sanemasa (July 20, 1855 – June 26, 1923) was a Japanese pharmacist and politician. He was Grand Chamberlain of Japan (1919–1922). He was the 10th governor of Saitama Prefecture (1899–1900). He was a recipient of the Order of the Sacred Treasure. He was made an earl in 1884, a recipient of the Order of the Rising Sun, 4th class in 1906, a recipient of the Order of the Sacred Treasure in 1910 and a recipient of the World War I Victory Medal in 1915.

References

1855 births
1923 deaths
Japanese pharmacists
Governors of Saitama Prefecture
Recipients of the Order of the Sacred Treasure, 3rd class
Presidents of the Japan Pharmaceutical Association